The 2013 Corpus Christi Fury season was the 11th season for the franchise, and their first as a member of the Ultimate Indoor Football League (UIFL). The team moving to the UIFL also changed their names from the Hammerhead to the Fury, and named LaDaniel Marshall the team's head coach.

Schedule
Key:

Regular season
All start times are local to home team

Postseason

Standings

y - clinched conference title
x - clinched playoff spot

Roster

References

Corpus Christi Fury
Corpus Christi Fury